New Horizon Mall is a modern retail space shopping centre in Rocky View County, Alberta, near Calgary. The mall opened its doors on May 1, 2018, As of February 2021, over 100 had opened for business. The grand opening was scheduled for October 27, 2018, however on September 21, 2018 the opening was pushed to 2019. It was modeled after the Pacific Mall in Markham, Ontario.

History

New Horizon Mall opened on May 1, 2018.  

A unique feature of the mall is that it features small independent shops rather than large chains like other shopping malls, with each unit being sold to investors as condominiums. According to the Mall's online directory, the majority of retail spaces are less than 300 square feet in size, and many of those are less than 150 square feet. Almost all of the rest are under 500 square feet. There is also a food court, and event stage, and heated underground parkade. 

New Horizon Mall hosts several events throughout the year including family events, trade shows, fashion shows & pop-up stores.

Anchors
Sky Castle Indoor Playground - Now Open 
The Best Shop - Now Open

References

Shopping malls in Alberta
Shopping malls established in 2018
2018 establishments in Alberta